Saradaga Kasepu is a Telugu comedy film starring Allari Naresh, Madhurima and Srinivas Avasarala in the lead roles, directed by Vamsy. The film was released on 17 September 2010. It is a remake of the 1986 Malayalam movie Mazha Peyyunnu Maddalam Kottunnu directed by Priyadarshan.

Plot
Ranga Babu (Allari Naresh) is a driver whose childhood friend is Srinivas (Srinivas Avasarala). Srinivas is from a rich family and lives in the U.S. The story takes a turn when Srinivas comes to India to get married and his parents (Jeeva, Sana) want him to tie the knot with Raja Rao's (Ahuti Prasad) daughter Manimala (Madhurima) who lives in a different place. However, Srinivas has a condition that he must know about the girl's character before marriage. For this, he switches places with Ranga Babu. As expected, misunderstandings and confusions arise. What happens from there forms the rest of the story.

Cast
 Allari Naresh as Ranga Babu
 Srinivas Avasarala as Srinivas
 Nyra Banerjee as Manimala
 Ahuti Prasad as Raja Rao
 Jeeva as Srinivas's dad
 Kondavalasa
 Duvvasi Mohan
 Krishna Bhagavan
 Narsing Yadav
 Jhansi
 Krishneswara Rao
 Sana
 Jaya Lalitha

Soundtrack 
The songs were composed by Chakri.

References

External links
 

Telugu remakes of Malayalam films
2010 films
2010s Telugu-language films
Films scored by Chakri
Films directed by Vamsy